The Royal Academy of Art (KABK) is an art and design academy in The Hague. Succeeding the Haagsche Teeken-Academie (part of the Confrerie Pictura), the academy was founded on 29 September 1682, making it the oldest in the Netherlands and one of the oldest in the world. The academy has been the training ground for a number of significant artists of the Hague School. It was part of the art movement of Dutch Impressionism and in the immediate vicinity of the II. Golden Age of Dutch painting. In the 19th century, however, training was still strongly oriented towards the classic curriculum. At the end of the 19th century, the academy had opened to Modernism, too.

History 

The Royal Academy of Art The Hague, was founded on September 29, 1682 by Willem Doudijns, Theodor van der Schuer, Daniel Mijtens the Younger, Robert Duval and Augustinus Terwesten as the Haagsche Teeken-Academie (engl.: "The Hague Drawing Academy".) In the evening there were drawings classes and on Saturday the society debated about art.

In the 18th century the Hague Academy was a thriving institution. The end of the 18th century were difficult times due to the absence of any financial support. The low point was around 1800, when the academy was working with less than ten students.

Under William I of the Netherlands finally support returned and the old and important institute grew. In 1821 the drawing education was combined with the newly established School of Civil Engineering. After being housed in the Korenbeurs and Boterwaag in 1839, a new neoclassical building was designed by city architect Zeger Reyers (1790-1857), located at the Prinsessegracht.

In the 19th century the artists Johannes Bosboom, Isaac Israëls, Willem Maris, Jan Hendrik Weissenbruch and George Hendrik Breitner were trained here. In 1937 on the site of the ancient temple completed a new academy building designed by J.H. Plantenga (1891–c. 1945), J.W.E. Buijs en J.B. Lürsen.

In 1990 the Royal Academy merged with the Royal Conservatory of The Hague into the "School of Visual Arts, Music and Dance". In 2010 the Dutch government elevated the joint institutions to "University of the Arts in The Hague". The two do also still go by their original names as well, to underline their individual identities.

The academy every two years awards the Gerrit Noordzij Prize initial designs.

Buildings

After the year of 1821, she received more importance again, as the School voor Burgerlijke Bouwkunde was connected to it. Now she moved in the house of the Korenbeurs (Grain Exchange). This small building was very important for the future of this school.

Later they moved to the Boterwaag (weighing house for butter). There wasn't enough light for the painting classes. Finally in the year 1839 the Academy got their own house at the Prinsessegracht - it was built by Zeger Reyers in the architectural style of the Neoclassicism .

In the 20th-century the classes do grow and more place was needed. Thus from 1934-1937 the academy got a new building at Prinsessegracht 4. The new building has been built in the style of the Bauhaus.

Hague School 

At the end of the 19th century witnessed the Hague art scene flourished, which was also very well known abroad as Hague School. Many well-known artists like Breitner, the brothers Maris (Jacob Maris and Matthijs Maris) and Bosboom were trained in the academy. In the first half of the 20th century the academy has played a pioneering role in the Netherlands, too.

Under Bauhaus- influence arose the new departments of photography and design.

In that time the teachers of the avant-garde such as Gerrit Kiljan (1881-1961), Paul Schuitema (1897-1973), Paul Citroen (1896-1983) and Cor Alon (1892-1967) dominated. The Academy expanded its curriculum as one of the first Dutch schools by teaching in the field of industrial design.

In 1938 a new building erected on the site of the old house. The design was by the architectural firm Plantenga, Buijs & Lürsen.

Modern times 
In 1990, the Academy and the Royal Conservatory joined into the Academy of Fine Arts, Music and Dance (now University of the Arts The Hague).

In 2000, a general overhaul lead by architect Van Mourik Vermeulen was carried out, enlarging the campus.

In 2001, a collaboration between Leiden University and the Royal Academy of Art resulted in the first formalised collaboration between a Dutch university and art institute. Royal Conservatory, KABK and Leiden University now offer joint degree programmes, including ones at doctoral level.

The academy's focus on novel technologies and new media has resulted in state-of-the-art workshops, studios and departments such as ArtScience, Interactive/Media/Design and Non-Linear Narrative.

Faculty and emeriti faculty

 Peter Biľak
 Erik van Blokland
 Gert Dumbar
 Gijs Bakker
 Mitch Paone
 Adam Broomberg
 Oliver Chanarin
 Rob Hornstra
 Donald Weber
 Kees Bol
 Jacobus Josephus Eeckhout
 Marcel van Eeden
 Gerrit Noordzij
 Paul Schuitema
 Fred Smeijers
 Nigel Thomson
 Sybren Valkema

Notable alumni

Johannes Bosboom
Isaac Israëls
George Hendrik Breitner
Gert Dumbar
Charles Leickert
Tom Manders
Jan Mankes
Willem Maris
Jacob Maris
Matthijs Maris
Charles Bolsius
Marcel van Eeden
Johanna van Eybergen
Alida Jantina Pott
Dolly Rudeman
Peter Alma
Kees Andrea
Jacob Jan van der Maaten
Pat Andrea
Joost Baljeu
Marius Bauer
Johfra
Joop Beljon
Lambert Lourijsen
Loek Bos
Rie Cramer
Jan Cremer
Toon Dupuis
Pierre Tetar van Elven
Willem van Genk
Carli Hermès
Karel Klinkenberg
Gerrit Noordzij
Yvonne Oerlemans
Nancy van Overveldt
Ootje Oxenaar
Ru Paré
Rahi Rezvani
Matthijs Röling
Toer van Schayk

References

External links 
 Official Website

 
Art schools in the Netherlands
1682 establishments in the Dutch Republic
Organisations based in The Hague
Organisations based in the Netherlands with royal patronage
Educational institutions established in the 1680s
Education in South Holland
Buildings and structures in The Hague